Acrocercops allactopa is a moth of the family Gracillariidae, known from Karnataka, India. The hostplants for the species include Eugenia cumini and Eugenia jambolana.

References

allactopa
Moths described in 1916
Moths of Asia